Doug Johnson is an American jazz and classical pianist who has performed with Esperanza Spalding and Grace Kelly. He teaches at the Berklee College of Music and at Wellesley College.

Education
Doug Johnson received a B.M. from Michigan State University and an M.M. from the New England Conservatory, where he studied with Dave Holland and George Russell.

Performances
Johnson has performed extensively in the U.S. at major venues such as the Jazz Standard in New York City. In Europe, he has performed in London, Vienna, Berlin, Paris, and Copenhagen. Festivals he has played at include Montreal, Toronto, Tanglewood, Oslo, Boston, Warsaw, and Newport Jazz Festival.

He has performed with Esperanza Spalding's quintet. Other musicians he has performed with include Luciana Souza, Mili Bermejo, Chiara Civello, the Grand Rapids Symphony, and the Handel and Haydn Society.

Discography
 The March of Time, 2008

With Grace Kelly
 Mood Changes, 2009
 Every Road I Walked, 2006
 Times Too, 2005
 Dreaming, 2004

References

Living people
American jazz pianists
American male pianists
Berklee College of Music faculty
Wellesley College faculty
Piano pedagogues
Michigan State University alumni
New England Conservatory alumni
21st-century American pianists
21st-century American male musicians
American male jazz musicians
Year of birth missing (living people)